The 41st Division was an infantry division of the British Army, raised during the First World War as part of Lord Kitchener's New Armies. The division saw service on the Western Front and later on the Italian Front.

Unit history 

The division was formed as part of the fifth wave (K5) of divisions in the New Army; it did not have a regional title, but was composed primarily of recruits from the south of England. Several of its battalions had been raised by local communities and were named for their towns or industries. After training and home service, the 41st Division, commanded by Major-General Sydney Lawford, deployed overseas to reinforce the British Expeditionary Force (BEF) on the Western Front in the first week of May 1916; its first major combat came in September of that year, at the Battle of Flers–Courcelette, part of the larger Battle of the Somme.

After fighting in 1917 at the Battle of Messines and the Battle of Passchendaele (also known as the Third Battle of Ypres) it was transferred with four other divisions to the Italian Front. It remained here for three months throughout the winter of 1917–18 before returning to the Western Front, where it arrived just before the German Army launched its Spring Offensive in March. It participated in the Allied "Hundred Days Offensive" and ended the war in Flanders, from where it moved to join the Army of Occupation in Germany, following the Armistice of 11 November 1918. The 41st Division was commanded by Major-General Sydney Lawford throughout its existence  and was demobilised in March 1919, with some units transferred to the 47th (1/2nd London) Division, British Army of the Rhine (BAOR).

Order of battle
The 41st Division was constituted as follows during the war:

122nd Brigade
 12th (Service) Battalion (Bermondsey), East Surrey Regiment
 15th (Service) Battalion (2nd Portsmouth), Hampshire Regiment
 11th (Service) Battalion (Lewisham), Queen's Own (Royal West Kent Regiment) (disbanded March 1918)
 18th (Service) Battalion (Arts and Crafts), King's Royal Rifle Corps
122nd Machine Gun Company (joined May 1916, moved to 41st Battalion Machine Gun Corps (M.G.C.) March 1918)
122nd Trench Mortar Battery (joined June 1916)

123rd Brigade
 11th (Service) Battalion, Queen's (Royal West Surrey Regiment)
 10th (Service) Battalion (Kent County), Queen's Own (Royal West Kent Regiment)
 23rd (Service) Battalion (2nd Football), Duke of Cambridge's Own (Middlesex Regiment)
 20th (Service) Battalion (Wearside), Durham Light Infantry (transferred to 124th Brigade March 1918)
123rd Machine Gun Company (joined June 1916, moved to 41st Battalion M.G.C. March 1918)
123rd Trench Mortar Battery (joined June 1916)

124th Brigade
 10th (Service) Battalion, Queen's (Royal West Surrey Regiment)
 26th (Service) Battalion, Royal Fusiliers (City of London Regiment)
 32nd (Service) Battalion, Royal Fusiliers (City of London Regiment) (disbanded March 1918)
 21st (Service) Battalion (Yeomen Rifles), King's Royal Rifle Corps (disbanded March 1918)
 20th (Service) Battalion (Wearside), Durham Light Infantry (transferred from 123rd Brigade March 1918)
124th Machine Gun Company (joined June 1916, moved to 41st Battalion Machine Gun Corps (M.G.C.) March 1918)
124th Trench Mortar Battery (joined June 1916)

Divisional Troops
13th (Service) Battalion, (Wandsworth) East Surrey Regiment (left October 1915)
23rd (Service) Battalion, (2nd Public Works) Middlesex Regiment ( joined as Divisional Pioneers October 1915)
238th Machine Gun Company (joined July 1917, left October 1917)
199th Machine Gun Company (joined October 1917, moved to 41st Battalion M.G.C. March 1918)
41st Battalion M.G.C. (formed March 1918 absorbing the brigade MG companies)
Divisional Mounted Troops	
B Squadron, Royal Wiltshire Yeomanry (left 31 May 1916)
41st Divisional Cyclist Company, Army Cyclist Corps (left 28 May 1916)
41st Divisional Train Army Service Corps
296th, 297th, 298th and 299th Companies
52nd Mobile Veterinary Section Army Veterinary Corps

Royal Artillery
CLXXXIII (Howitzer) Brigade, Royal Field Artillery R.F.A. (broken up November 1916)
CLXXXVII Brigade, R.F.A.
CLXXXIX Brigade, R.F.A. (left January 1917)
CXC Brigade, R.F.A.
41st Divisional Ammunition Column (West Ham) R.F.A.
V.41 Heavy Trench Mortar Battery, R.F.A. (formed July 1916; disbanded October 1917)
X.41, Y.41 and Z.41 Medium Mortar Batteries, R.F.A. (formed May 1916; in April 1918, Z broken up redistributed among X and Y batteries)
XIII Belgian Field Artillery Regiment (attached January to May 1917)

Royal Engineers
228th (Barnsley) Field Company
233rd (Ripon) Field Company
237th (Reading) Company
41st Divisional Signals Company

Royal Army Medical Corps
138th Field Ambulance
139th Field Ambulance
140th Field Ambulance
84th Sanitary Section (left April 1917)

Notable people associated with the division
 Walter Tull
 Robert Anthony Eden, 1st Earl of Avon, Prime Minister 1955–1957
 Robert Cyril Morton Jenkins British Senior Police Officer

See also

 List of British divisions in World War I

References

External links 
The British Army in the Great War: The 41st Division

Infantry divisions of the British Army in World War I
Kitchener's Army divisions
Military units and formations established in 1915
1915 establishments in the United Kingdom
Italian front (World War I)